William Blaisdell (April, 1865–January 1, 1931) was an American actor of both stage and screen.

Among his roles on stage was the Marquis de Pontsablé in the comic opera Madame Favart. He also starred in several comedic short films with Harold Lloyd in 1918.

Blaisdell died in 1931. His widow, fellow actor Clara Lavine, died at age 75 on December 29, 1948.

Selected filmography
Bashful (1917)
Step Lively (1917)
Fireman Save My Child (1918)
Here Come the Girls (1918)
On the Jump (1918)
Pipe the Whiskers (1918)
Take a Chance (1918)
Hey There! (1918)
The City Slicker (1918)
An Ozark Romance (1918)
Bees in His Bonnet (1918)
Swing Your Partners (1918)
Hear 'Em Rave (1918)
Two-Gun Gussie (1918)
Hot Sands (1924)
 Racing Luck (1924)
 The Yankee Clipper (1927)
 Rough Dried (1929)
 Sappy Service (1929)

References

External links

1865 births
1931 deaths
American male silent film actors
American male stage actors
20th-century American male actors
Place of birth missing
Burials at Kensico Cemetery